Laurens Rijnbeek (born 22 May 1981 in Arnhem) is a former footballer who played as a centre back for Achilles '29 in the Dutch Eerste Divisie. He formerly played for VDZ, RKHVV and VV De Bataven. The 2013–14 season was Rijnbeek's last for the Groesbeek side, because he wanted to spend more time with his family.

References

External links
 Voetbal International profile 

1981 births
Living people
Dutch footballers
Association football defenders
Eerste Divisie players
Achilles '29 players
Footballers from Arnhem
20th-century Dutch people
21st-century Dutch people